Novena is an open-source computing hardware project designed by Andrew "bunnie" Huang and Sean "Xobs" Cross. The initial design of Novena started in 2012. It was developed by Sutajio Ko-usagi Pte. Ltd. and funded by a crowdfunding campaign which began on April 15, 2014. The first offering was a 1.2 GHz Freescale Semiconductor i.MX6 quad-core ARM architecture computer closely coupled with a Xilinx FPGA. It was offered in "desktop", "laptop", or "heirloom laptop" form, or as a standalone motherboard.

On May 19, 2014, the crowdfunding campaign concluded having raised just over 280% of its target. The extra funding allowed the project to achieve the following four "stretch goals", with the three hardware stretch goals being shipped in the form of add-on boards that use the Novena's special high-speed I/O expansion header, as seen in the upper-left of the Novena board:

 Development of free and open source graphics drivers for the on-board video accelerator (etnaviv)
 Inclusion of a general-purpose breakout board providing 16 FPGA outputs and eight FPGA inputs (3.3 or 5 V gang-selectable via software), six 10-bit analog inputs (up to 200 ksps sample rate) and two 10-bit analog outputs (~100 ksps max rate)
 Inclusion of a "ROMulator" breakout board capable of emulating TSOP NAND flash devices
 Inclusion of a MyriadRF software-defined radio at all hardware-purchasing backing levels.

The Novena shipped with a screwdriver, as users are required to install the battery themselves, screw on the LCD bezel of their choice, and obtain speakers as a kit instead of using speaker boxes. Owners of a 3D printer can make and fine tune their own speaker box. The mainboards were manufactured by AQS, an electronics manufacturing services provider.

See also

 Open-source hardware
 Modular smartphone

References

External links
 Novena page on Sutajio Ko-Usagi's wiki
 Building an Open Source Laptop
 The Novena Open Laptop
 Novena Five-Year Anniversary: End-of-Life

Laptops
Open-source hardware
American inventions
Computer-related introductions in 2014
Modular design